Aktar Islam (born 1980) is a multiple award-winning English Michelin starred chef, restaurateur and entrepreneur. He left the Lasan Group in 2016 to work on his new, flagship project, Opheem and launched his new Italian restaurant, Legna in winter 2018. His new group of restaurants concentrate on celebration of ingredients and are dedicated to gastronomy.  Both Opheem and Legna have opened to critical acclaim and Opheem has received its first Michelin star in October 2019 and is the first and only Michelin starred Indian restaurant in the UK outside of London. Pulperia; an Argentine restaurant built around the celebration of beef opened its doors in March 2020 and has gone on to become the only Michelin listed Steak restaurant in Birmingham.

AI Restaurant Group now has three restaurants and continues to grow, the group is steered by Aktar Islams focus on product led cooking whilst creating opportunities for young individuals from Birmingham.

In 2009, Aktar Islam was crowned champion by Gordon Ramsay on Channel 4's The F Word. In June 2011, he won the fish course in the final of the BBC Two series Great British Menu. He returned to the Great British Menu Kitchen as a veteran Judge in 2022.

Early life
Islam was born and brought up in Birmingham, England. His parents are from Bangladesh and came to Britain in the late 1970s. He is the second eldest of five sons.

Islam attended Prince Albert School. At the age of 13, Islam's first job was working at his father's restaurant.

Career
Aktar Islam started working in the restaurant industry from the age of 13, his first restaurant project; Karma in Shirley Solihull was launched when he was 20.

In 2007, he launched his cookbook and DVD, called the Spice of Life, in collaboration with Warwick University Medical school.

In 2010, Islam and sous chef, Aysan Shaikh, beat Curry Corner from Cheltenham  on Channel 4's The F Word after beating Santa Maria (South American cuisine) and Sweet Mandarin (Chinese cuisine) in the semi-final. Aktar Islam then went on to win the overall final, after beating The Pheasant from Keystone.

In June 2011, Islam won the Central regional heat to reach the final of the BBC Two series Great British Menu. He went on to win the fish course in the final. Islam's other television appearances include Market Kitchen, Perfect, Saturday Kitchen, and The One Show. He is a regular judge and mentor for MasterChef Professionals and Also a veteran Judge on Great British Menu. Along  with other celebrity chefs, he attends the BBC Good Food Shows, Autumn Fair, Heart of England Fine Foods, Food & Drink Expo, Taste festivals, Grand Design LIVE and Sharon Osbourne's Mrs. Osbourne Presents.

Until 2017 Islam co-owned Indian restaurants; Lasan, Lasan Eatery (now known as Raja Monkey), Nosh and Quaff, and Argentinian restaurant Fiesta Del Asado.

Islam has also attended a reception at Buckingham Palace, invited by Queen Elizabeth II and Prince Philip for his contribution to the British hospitality industry. Islam was selected by Marketing Birmingham to represent the city in their Birmingham Bites campaign.

He left the Lasan Group in 2017 to work on his new, flagship project, Opheem which opened May 2018 and was awarded a Michelin Star in October 2019 making Opheem the first and only Michelin starred Indian restaurant outside of London. Legna was launched in winter 2018. He launched Pulperia in Brindley Place Birmingham in March 2020 and in due to launch another restaurant in Edgbaston Birmingham in 2021. Aktar at Home was launched in spring 2020 as a response to the national lockdown, this service has been praised by the Michelin starred chef community, has garnered support and praise  from national press and the general public.

Awards
In 2010, Aktar won 'Best Local Restaurant' on Gordon Ramsay's The F Word.

in 2019 he also won the biggest fish award
In 2011, Aktar came first in the BBC TV Series, The Great British Menu.

In May 2012, Aktar was named Birmingham Young Professional of the Year.

In October 2019, Aktar Islam became the first British born Bangladeshi Chef to be awarded a Michelin star, and Opheem became the only Michelin starred Indian/Bangladeshi restaurant in the UK outside of London.

Personal life
Islam lives in Birmingham and has a son Alex (born 2007)

Islam also supports charities including Birmingham Children's Hospital, NHS Organ Donor Campaign, Oxfam and NHS/Warwick University Spice for Life campaign.

Despite his name, he is not a Muslim.

References

External links 

 https://opheem.com/

1980 births
Living people
English people of Bangladeshi descent
English chefs
English restaurateurs
English businesspeople
Chefs of Indian cuisine
People from Birmingham, West Midlands
20th-century Bengalis

bn:আখতার ইসলাম